Zhang Xiaotao (born 1970 in Hechuan, Chongqing, China), is a Chinese painter based in Beijing and Chengdu.

He graduated from the Oil Painting Department of Sichuan Academy of Fine Arts  in 1996.
He then became a teacher in the Southwest Jiaotong University, Chengdu and this lasted from 1996 to 2009. In 2010 Xiaotao taught in the New Media Department of the Sichuan Fine Arts Institute. Now he lives and works in Beijing and Chongqing.

Zhang makes paintings with sexual imagery often involving small animals such as frogs and snakes, and incorporating images of putrefaction and pollution.

His work Condom Series: Enlarged Props – Crystal And Fishes 2 sold for US$64,500 at Sotheby's Hong Kong in 2007.

Near death experiences

When Xiaotao was 7 he visited the shore of the powerful Yangtze River, where he was playing with his friends. His brother's friend pulled young Xiaotao into the current, just messing around, but soon lost control and had to swim ashore. Xiaotao remained out in the water and almost drown before an adult who could brave the current came to his rescue. That tentative, struggling moment between life and death influences the artist's work expansively. His watery paint-strokes summon additional, related junctures of mortal existence: the point between conception and life, the limbo between death and afterlife, the suspension of time during coital climax. Xiaotao had an additional swimming accident, that too at the age of 7. Xiaotao now has frequently recurring dreams about drowning which, coupled with his accidents, most likely accounts for all the water imagery in his work.

"Joyful Time" display
This display took place in Oakland, California at the Pacific Bridge Gallery.

Zhang Xiaotao's "A Joyful Time," displays huge oil and watercolor paintings inviting viewers into a bright underwater world of copulating frogs and intertwined human forms, the reaction "elated and free" may come to mind. In the display amphibious creatures float unencumbered in washes of blue, green, and orange paint, with their outlines making whimsical, eye-pleasing shapes. Perhaps this is a reflection of Xiaotao's background. Xiaotao nearly drowned as a child and is afraid of water and he comes from a country whose reproductive policies are heavy-handed and punitive.

In Zhang's opinion, oil paint is made to reflect the character of an ancient culture while embracing modern themes and colors. Fish, snakes, human faces, beer mugs, and condoms are repeating elements used by Xiaotao which appear in intricate layers of paint that defy opacity. The creatures' hues are often the blues and greens of the traditional Chinese pottery and carvings that can be found in jade markets, but placed in front of or behind the animals' outlines are shapes and symbols that would challenge, if not startle, any unsuspecting market regular.

In more than one painting, a pair of frogs hug blissfully, doggie-style. They are free-falling, not anchored to anything except each other-getting ready, perhaps, for their parachutes to open. On one canvas, they look skyward against a backdrop of floating clouds. On another surface, their background is a motif of human couplings taken from an ancient Chinese "pillow book" of how-to positions for adults.

The repetitiveness of the pillow-book images evokes pop art. But where Andy Warhol used a checkerboard of soup cans or Marilyn's head, here the repeated element is always erotic: trios and couples in sexual play, sprinkled lightly across the backdrop. They make the canvas, from a distance, look like a textile, like a bed sheet.

While pop artists of the '50s and '60s were paying homage to postwar consumerism and icons of mass-production, China was still in the throes of the Cultural Revolution. But here Zhang turns to his artistic predecessors and, as if making up for lost time, incorporates their method. Even the vibrant sheen that some of his paintings seem to give off is reminiscent of silk screening, a mass-production technique that Warhol adopted in the early 1960s.

Some of the largest works, at the back of the gallery, are also the most provocative. In dark gray-green hazes float huge, rubbery shapes. They are transparent sheaths with reservoir tips, and faces peer from behind, or inside. Tiny bubbles are suspended within the wrinkled tubes, and here and there a splattered dollop of red paint contrasts with the green. The faces glisten as if behind a windowpane, and their wide-eyed constraint elicits sadness.

Everywhere in Zhang's work one finds splotches of the red paint. It appears to be mixed with something that won't quite blend with it, and the effect is that of a potato stamp made from a bumpy, many-eyed spud. In the context of sex and birth, though, these bubbles and deep-red blotches are semen and blood. They are the repeating threads of humanity: liquids that transmit life, inheritance, and the most essential fluids of ancestry-containing not only DNA, but also the ways in which we (both animals and humans) need each other and hurt each other. In their aqueous environment, the drops, smears, and splotches also remind one of amoebas seen under a microscope, like beads of a primordial sea.

The sensation of water is hard to shake. The oil paint itself has a liquid quality-it has been thinned enough to resemble watercolour from a short distance -and layered images often appear soaked, suspended, or dripped on. Zhang's frequently recurring dreams about drowning presumably account for all the water imagery in his work; his preoccupation stems from two swimming accidents when he was seven years old: one happened at the shore of the powerful Yangtze River, where he was playing with his companions. His brother's friend had pulled him into the current, teasingly, but soon lost control and had to swim ashore. Zhang remained out in the water and was almost dead before an adult who could brave the current came to his rescue. That tentative, struggling moment between life and death informs the artist's work expansively. His watery paint-strokes summon additional, related junctures of mortal existence: the point between conception and life, the limbo between death and afterlife, the suspension of time during coital climax.

If every one of Zhang's paintings, as he claims, is a glimpse into his dreams about drowning, then it would seem his nightmares have faded over time and produced aesthetic remnants. Yet new demons, universal ones, have popped out of his work while he processed his fears. The underwater trauma that transformed itself into beauty via paint and repetition reinvents itself here with new sociological and psychological overtones. Something new is displacing his original memories, overlaying passion upon experience, and revealing the intersection of childhood and adulthood.

Awards
2012
 The Best Technology Award of Asian Youth Animation Contest 2012, Guiyang, China
2011
 The Best Technology Award of Asian Youth Animation Contest 2011, Guiyang, China
2010
 Nomination of Reshaping History: China Art 2000-2009, Beijing, China
2009
 Prize of Excellent Works of Chongqing Youth Art Biennial, Chongqing, China
2008
 Young Artists Award of 2nd Critics Annual Exhibition, Beijing, China
1996
 1st Prize of Mei Yuan Cup, Lu Xun Academy of Fine Arts, Shenyang, China

Solo exhibitions

2016
 Zhang Xiaotao: The Spring of Huangjueping, Pékin Fine Arts, Beijing, China
2014
 Worlds of the Trichiliocosm, Wilfrid Israel Asian Art Museum, Wilfrid, Israel
 In The Realm of Microcosmic, Pekin Fine Arts (Beijing), Beijing, China
 Plum Flower Patterns, white box art center, Beijing, China
 Empty Shadow, Jin Ji Hu art, Museum, Suzhou, China
2013
 Transition，Museum Of Contemporary Art Chengdu ，Chengdu ，China
2012
 Spiritual Encoding, Kuandu Museum of Fine Arts, Taipei, China
2011
 Sakya, White Box Museum of Art, Beijing, China
2010
 Epidemiology，Guangdong Museum of Art, Guangzhou, China
2008
 Microscopic Narration，Iberia Center for Contemporary Art, Beijing, China
2007
 Rebirth, Arthur M. Sackler Museum of Art and Archaeology of Beijing University, Beijing, China
 Desires without Limits, Dolores de Sierra Galería de Arte, Madrid, Spain
 Night, Shanghai e-Arts, Shanghai, China
2006
 Beautiful Imbroglio, He Xiangning Art Museum, Shenzhen, China
2005
 Dreamscapes, International Art Foundation 3.14 Bergen, Norway
 Dream Factory · Rubbish Heap, Tokyo Gallery, Japan
 Dreamscapes, M.K.Ciulionis Nat. Museum of Art, Kaunas, Lithuania
2004
 Dream Factory ﹒Rubbish Heap, Beijing Tokyo Art Projects, China
2003
 Materialistic Decay, Akie Aricchi Art Contemporary Gallery, Paris, France
2002
 Desire, Kunst Akademie Muenster, Germany
2001
 Zhang Xiaotao solo exhibition, Tokyo Gallery, Japan
2000
 Fabricated Images, Pacific Bridge Gallery, Oakland, U.S.A

Group exhibitions

2015
 Point to Asia- 6th Moscow Biennale of Contemporary Art, Moscow, Russia
 Chinese Contemporary Art Invitational Exhibition 2015, Ming Yuan Art Gallery, Shanghai, China
 Chang Jiang International Image Biennale, Chang Jiang Art & Culture Club, Chongqing, China
 Asian Media Art Festival, Art Gallery of Chung-Ang University, Soul, Korea
 New Era – Created in China, Arhus Kunstmuseum, Aarhus, Denmark

2014
 Liquid Culture- China & Korea New Media Art Exhibition, Seoul Museum of Art, Seoul, Korea
 The Visible and The Invisible - Video and Photography from China Today, John and Mable Ringling Museum of Art in Florida, USA
 Echo – Multidimensional Traditions of Chinese Contemporary Art Exhibition, Hamburg Art Museum, Hamburg, Germany
 Translated Concussion—Chinese New Media Art Techniques and Practice since 2000, MOCA, Chengdu, China

2013 
 China Pavilion at the 55th Venice Biennale, Arsenal, Venice, Italy
 Pure Views: New Painting from China, St. Monica Arts Center, Barcelona, Spain

2012   
 Chinese animation since the 1930S，7th Asia Pacific Triennial of Contemporary Art, Queensland Art Gallery, :Queensland, Australia 
 Holland International Animation Film Festival, Holland Animation Film Foundation, Amsterdam, the Netherlands
 Roaming the World—Zhang xiaotao and Pierre Exhibition, Chengdu Contemporary Art Museum, Chengdu, China
 Inward Gazes—Performance Art Documenta of China 2012, Macao Art Museum, Macao, China

2011
 Mountains and Rivers – Speechless Poem, Berne Art Museum, Berne, Switzerland  
 New Age: Australia-China International New Media Arts Exhibition, QUT Art Museum，Australia 
 Relationship: New Chinese Construction Art, Museum of Art for the XXI Century, Rome, Italy

2010
 Material and Code: Disciplinary Crossings of Cinema Studies and New Media, Chicago University, Chicago, USA
 Beijing Time, Santiago de Compostela, Santiago, Spain
 Heart—Forefront of Contemporary Architecture in China Exhibition, Vitra Design Museum, Weimar, Germany
 Arena: A Post Boom in Beijing, Hazelhurst Regional Gallery & Arts Centre, Hazelhurst, Australia
 The Big Bang, White Rabbit Museum, Sydney, Australia
 Pure Views: China New paintings, Louise Blouin Foundation, London, UK

2009
 Beijing Time, Casa Asia Matadero Madrid, Madrid, Spain
 Ink Not Ink—Chinese Contemporary Ink Painting Exhibition, Drexel University Art Museum, Philadelphia, USA
 Contemporary Art Rebirth of China, Palazzo Reale Museum, Milan, Italy

2008
 55 Days in Valencia, Valencia Museum of Modern Art, Valencia, Spain
 Transgressive Body, TAPE Art Center, Berlin, Germany
 The Revolution Continues, Saatchi Gallery, London, UK
 Poetic Realism—A Reinterpretation to South of Yangtze River, Francisco Tomásy Valiente Art Center, Madrid, Spain

2007
 Starting From Southwest, Guangdong Art Museum, Guangzhou, China
 Chinese Whisper, Osage kwun tong, Hong Kong
 New Painting from Southwest China, K gallery, Chengdu, China
 From New Figurative image to New Painting, Tang Contemporary Art, Beijing, China 3 Langue 3 Colors, UM Gallery, Seoul, Korean
 3rd Guiyang Art Biennale, Guiyang Art Museum, Guizhou, China
 The Art of Seduction—From Schiele to Warhol, Minoritenkloster Tulln, Austria

2006
 Jiang Hu, Jack Tilton Gallery, New York
 City Skin, Shenzhen Art Museum, Shenzhen
 Internal injuries, Marella arte contemporanea, Beijing
 Poetic Realism: A reinterpretation of Jiangnan, RCM Art Museum, Nanjing
 Enchanting Images of a Changing World, Vienna Essl Museum, Austria
 Unclear and Cleamess, Heyri Art Foundation, Korean
 The Road map of Painting 2, Beijing Tokyo Art Projects Beijing
 Varied Images, Shanghai art museum

2005
 China Contemporary painting, Fondazione Carisbo, Italy
 2nd Prague Biennial, Prague, National Gallery Veletrzni Palac, Prague
 2nd Triennial of Chinese Arts, Nanjing Art Museum Nanjing
 2nd Chengdu Biennial, the Modern Art Museum, Chengdu
 Young Chinese Contemporary art, Hangar-7, Austria
 China Contemporary Painting, APalazzo Bricherasio, Torino, Italy

2004
 Forbidden Senses ? – Sensuality In Contemporary Chinese Art
 Espace Culturel François Mitterrand, Périgueux, France
 China Today Painting, Infeld-Haus der Kulturen, Vienna, Austria
 China's photographic painting, China Art seasons, Beijing
 Officina Asia, Galleria d’Arte Modema, Bologna, Italy
 New Perspectives in Chinese Painting, Marella arte contemporanea, Milano, Italy
 Artificial Happiness, RMIT Museum Melbourne, Australia
 Live in Chengdu, Shenzhen Art Museum, Shenzhen

2003
 left hand -right Hand, 798 Space Beijing
 Composite picture of Asian, Hong Kong Art Museum
 Image of image, Shenzhen Art Museum. Shenzhen
 Illusory, Museun63, Hong Kong. Guangdong art Museum
 links between two points, Tokyo gallery Japan

2002
 Dream, Chinese contemporary Art, CAC. Manchester
 Korean Contemporary Art Festival, Seoul Art Center, Korea
 Triennial of Chinese Arts, Guangzhou Art Museum
 Beijing Afloat, Beijing Tokyo Art Projects Beijing

2001
 Up-Down-Right-Left, -the Feminism etc., the Modern Art Museum, Chengdu
 Dream, Chinese contemporary art, Atlantic's Gallery, London
 Youth in transition, He xiangning Art Museum Shenzhen

2000
 Time of Reviving, 2000 Contemporary Art Exhibition of China, Upriver Gallery, Chengdu
 Between the Dreams and the Picturesque Meaning, Vienna Between 1900 And 2000, Schloss Cappenberg, Germany

1999
 '99 Academic Exhibition, Upriver Gallery, Chengdu, China

1997
 Urban Personality and Contemporary Art, Southwest Jiaotong University, Chengdu, China

1996
 Personal Experience Show, Art Museum of Sichuan Fine Arts Institute, Chongqing, China

Selected exhibitions
2007
 Three Languages Three Colors, UM Gallery, Korea

2006
 Jiang Hu, Jack Tilton Gallery, New York, U.S.A.
 Unclear and Cleanness, Heyri Art Foundation, Korea
 Beautiful Imbroglio, He Xiang Ning Art Museum, Shenzhen, China (solo)

2005
 Dreamscapes, Foundation3, 14 Bergen, Norway (solo)
 Dream Factory - Rubbish heap, Tokyo Gallery, Japan (solo)
 2nd Prague Biennial, Prague, National Gallery Veletrzni Palac, Prague, Czech Republic
 2nd Triennial of Chinese Arts, Nanjing Art Museum, Nanjing, China

2004
 Officinal Asia, Galleria d’Arte Modema, Bologna, Italy
 New Perspectives in Chinese Painting, Marella arte contemporanea, Milan, Italy

2003
 Materialistic Decay, Gallery Akie Aricchi Art Contemporary, Paris, France (solo)

2002
 Desire, Kunstakademie Muenster, Germany (solo)
 Triennial of Chinese Arts, Guangzhou Art Museum, China

2001
 Flowers in the dream, Tokyo Gallery, Japan (solo)

2000
 Joyful Time, Gallery Akie Aricchi Art Contemporary, Paris, France (solo)
 Fabricated Images, Pacific Bridge Gallery, Oakland, U.S.A (solo)
 Joyful Time, Gallery Hartmann, Munich, Germany (solo)

Individual pieces of work
 Xiaotao's painting titled "Enlarged prop - Bird," which is a dreamy looking painting of an emaciated looking bird attempting to feed or analyzing some sort of nest looking thing. Xiaotao emphasises lose detail here which invokes the dreamy feel. This painting is estimated to be priced around US$250,000.
 Another painting called "Fictioned Images No. 2" by Xiaotao, which is priced in the range of US$100,000, is a painting of a man looking through a glass mug. The glass mug distorts the man's face as he analyzes the glass. This painting also has Xiaotao's signature red splotches.
 Xiaotao's painting named "Crystal Condom" shows a yellow and a purple condom almost floating in the air in front of a blue background. This painting's price is estimated to be worth about US$85,000.

References

External links
Article by Feng Boyi on Zhang Xiaotao
Images, biography and texts about Zhang Xiaotao from the Saatchi Gallery
 by Kristianna Bertelsen on Zhang Xiaotao

Living people
1970 births
Painters from Chongqing